Fred Kunzel (June 2, 1901 – November 19, 1969) was a United States district judge of the United States District Court for the Southern District of California.

Education and career

Born in Buffalo, New York, Kunzel was a private in the United States Army during World War I, from 1917 to 1919. He received an Artium Baccalaureus degree from Stanford University in 1925 and a Juris Doctor from Stanford Law School in 1927. He was in private practice in San Diego, California from 1928 to 1959, and returned to military service as a Commander in the United States Naval Reserve in World War II, from 1942 to 1945.

Federal judicial service

On February 16, 1959, Kunzel was nominated by President Dwight D. Eisenhower to a seat on the United States District Court for the Southern District of California vacated by Judge Jacob Weinberger. Kunzel was confirmed by the United States Senate on September 9, 1959, and received his commission the following day. He served as Chief Judge from 1967 until his death on November 19, 1969.

References

Sources
 

1901 births
1969 deaths
Judges of the United States District Court for the Southern District of California
United States district court judges appointed by Dwight D. Eisenhower
20th-century American judges
Stanford Law School alumni
United States Navy officers
20th-century American lawyers
United States Army personnel of World War I